Hyderi is a neighborhood in the Karachi Central district of Karachi, Pakistan.

Economy 
Hyderi has become a thriving market housing as a successful shopping district and is very famous for ladies' fabric and shoe shopping. All the major shopping district has existed here for many years which included the second branch of Dolmen Mall, Saima Paari Mall and others.

References

External links 
 Karachi Website 

Neighbourhoods of Karachi
North Nazimabad Town